Gunnar Sandborg (7 June 1927 – 5 May 2022) was a Norwegian rower who competed in the 1948 Summer Olympics.

References

1927 births
2022 deaths
Norwegian male rowers
Olympic rowers of Norway
Rowers at the 1948 Summer Olympics